Kusmayanto Kadiman (born in Bandung, West Java May 1, 1954) is Indonesian Minister for Research and Technology in United Indonesia Cabinet.

Education
He studied engineering physics at Bandung Institute of Technology, graduating in 1977. He received his Doctor of Philosophy (PhD) from Australian National University in 1988.

Career
He has served as head of Pusat Komputer PIKSI, Bandung Institute of Technology and 
rector of Bandung Institute of Technology.
He was Minister for Research and Technology, United Indonesia Cabinet, 2004–2009.

Personal life
He is married and has two sons and a daughter.

References

1954 births
People from Bandung
Australian National University alumni
Bandung Institute of Technology alumni
Government ministers of Indonesia
Javanese people
Living people
Science and technology in Indonesia